Volger Andersson (January 19, 1896, Njurunda – October 6, 1969) was a former Swedish cross-country skier who competed in the 1920s.

He won a bronze in the 50 km event at the 1928 Winter Olympics in St. Moritz. He also competed in the 18 km event but did not finish.

Cross-country skiing results
All results are sourced from the International Ski Federation (FIS).

Olympic Games
 1 medal – (1 bronze)

References

External links 
 
 
 
 

1896 births
1969 deaths
People from Sundsvall Municipality
Cross-country skiers from Västernorrland County
Swedish male cross-country skiers
Olympic cross-country skiers of Sweden
Cross-country skiers at the 1928 Winter Olympics
Olympic bronze medalists for Sweden
Olympic medalists in cross-country skiing
Medalists at the 1928 Winter Olympics